Decatur is the largest city and the county seat of Macon County in the U.S. state of Illinois, with a population of 70,522 as of the 2020 Census. The city was founded in 1829 and is situated along the Sangamon River and Lake Decatur in Central Illinois. Decatur is the seventeenth-most populous city in Illinois.

The city is home of private Millikin University and public Richland Community College. Decatur has an economy based on industrial and agricultural commodity processing and production, including the North American headquarters of agricultural conglomerate Archer Daniels Midland, international agribusiness Tate & Lyle's largest corn-processing plant, and the designing and manufacturing facilities for Caterpillar Inc.'s wheel-tractor scrapers, compactors, large wheel loaders, mining class motor grader, off-highway trucks, and large mining trucks.

History
The city is named after War of 1812 naval hero Stephen Decatur.

Decatur is an affiliate of the U.S. Main Street program, in conjunction with the National Trust for Historic Preservation.

The Potawatomi Trail of Death passed through here in 1838.

Post No. 1 of the Grand Army of the Republic was founded by Civil War veterans in Decatur on April 6, 1866.

The Edward P. Irving House, designed by Frank Lloyd Wright and built in 1911, is located at No. 2 Millikin Place, Decatur. In addition, the Robert Mueller Residence, 1 Millikin Place, and the Adolph Mueller Residence, 4 Millikin Place, have been attributed to Wright's assistants Hermann V. von Holst and Marion Mahony.

Abraham Lincoln

Decatur was the first home in Illinois of Abraham Lincoln, who settled just west of Decatur with his family in 1830. At the age of 21, Lincoln gave his first political speech in Decatur about the importance of Sangamon River navigation that caught the attention of Illinois political leaders. As a lawyer on the 8th Judicial Circuit, Lincoln made frequent stops in Decatur, and argued five cases in the log courthouse that stood on the corner of Main & Main Streets. The original courthouse is now on the grounds of the Macon County Historical Museum on North Fork Road. John Hanks, first cousin of Abraham Lincoln, lived in Decatur.

On May 9 and 10, 1860, the Illinois Republican State Convention was held in Decatur. At this convention Lincoln received his first endorsement for President of the United States as "The Railsplitter Candidate". In commemoration of Lincoln's bicentennial, the Illinois Republican State Convention was held in Decatur at the Decatur Conference Center and Hotel on June 6 and 7, 2008.

ADM scandals and corporate exit

In early November 1992, the high-ranking Archer Daniels Midland Co. (ADM) executive Mark Whitacre confessed to an FBI agent that ADM executives, including Whitacre himself, had routinely met with competitors to fix the price of lysine, a food additive.

The lysine conspirators, including ADM, ultimately settled federal charges for more than $100 million. ADM also paid hundreds of millions of dollars ($400 million alone on the high-fructose corn syrup class action case) to plaintiffs and customers that it stole from during the price-fixing schemes. Furthermore, several Asian and European lysine and citric acid producers that conspired to fix prices with ADM paid criminal fines in the tens of millions of dollars to the U.S. government. Several executives, including the vice chairman of ADM, served federal prison time.

The investigation and prosecution of ADM and some of its executives has been reported to be one of the "best documented corporate crimes in American history". The events were the basis of a book named The Informant, and a film by the same name.

In 2013, ADM reported that some employees had violated the Foreign Corrupt Practices Act, and ADM was fined 14 million U.S. dollars, but avoided criminal charges by self-reporting the foreign bribes.

In 2014, ADM moved its upper corporate management out of Decatur and established the new ADM World Headquarters in downtown Chicago. Following the ADM corporate exit, Decatur became listed by the United States Census Bureau as number 3 in "The 15 Fastest-Declining Large Cities" which showed a 7.1% population loss of (-5,376) from 2010 to 2019.

Consecutive tornadoes
On April 18 and 19, 1996, the city was hit by tornadoes. On April 18, an F1 tornado hit the city's southeast side, followed by an F3 tornado the following evening on the northwest side. That same tornado then skipped twice hitting businesses on the northeast side. The two storms totaled approximately $10.5 million in property damage.

Railcar explosion
On July 19, 1974, a tanker car containing isobutane collided with a boxcar in the Norfolk & Western railroad yard in the East End of Decatur. The resulting explosion killed seven people, injured 349, and caused $18 million in property damage including extensive damage to nearby Lakeview High School.

Jesse Jackson protest
In November 1999, Decatur was brought into the national news when Jesse Jackson and the Rainbow/PUSH Coalition protested the two-year expulsion of seven African American students who had been involved in a serious fight at an Eisenhower High School football game under a recently enacted "zero tolerance" policy. Six of the students were arrested but not charged after the fracas. Four were later charged as adults with mob action, a felony. Jesse Jackson intervened in the incident, bringing the controversy to national attention, protesting both the severity and length of the punishment and also alleging racial bias (schools in Decatur in 1999 had an enrollment that was about 44 percent black and five of the six Decatur students expelled in the prior year were black). Jackson pointed out he was invited by the students' parents and that he spoke with them, the kids, ministers and teachers before protesting the zero-tolerance severity of the punishment: "No one can survive zero tolerance," Jackson said. "We all need mercy and grace."

Outside of Decatur, public support was largely against the School Board's decision but changed once a videotape of the incident surfaced filmed by a parent at the game. Broadcast on national TV news, it showed a melee that swept through one end of the grandstands, with kicking and punching, as some of the fighters tumbled over the rails. The game was stopped and players gawked at the fighting in the bleachers. Ed Bohem, the principal at MacArthur High School who attended the game, described it as a riot: "I feared for the safety of our people -- my parents, my students," Bohem said, referring to the crowd in the bleachers. "You had people pushed through bars, people covering little children so they wouldn't get hurt. It was violent." Jackson and his Rainbow PUSH Coalition organized marches that included hundreds of people bused in from outside the area, criticizing the school board for what Jackson said was unfairly harsh treatment of the boys over a fight. Jackson was arrested and detained briefly; however, charges were later dropped. School officials say the students involved in the fighting were known as truants, described three of them as "third-year freshmen", and noted that the seven students combined had missed 350 days of high school.

The issue dissipated when the school board reduced the original expulsions from two years to one year and agreed to let the students earn credit while attending an alternative school.

The students involved in the fight have since taken different paths in life: with one being sentenced to state prison for 10 years for a 2004 felony drug conviction; another having finished college (helped by a Rainbow PUSH scholarship); another working as a butcher; and a fourth being arrested for home invasion in 2009. Jesse Jackson was criticized for turning what could have been a legitimate criticism/discussion of the effects of "zero tolerance" policies into national debate by attempting to present the seven youths as victims of bigotry.

Geography
Decatur is 150 miles southwest of Chicago, 40 miles east of Springfield, the state capital, and 110 miles northeast of St. Louis.

Lakes include Lake Decatur, an 11 km2 reservoir formed in 1923 by the damming of the Sangamon River, accounting for >90% of the state's census-designated water area.

The Decatur Metropolitan Statistical Area (population 109,900) includes surrounding towns of Argenta, Boody, Blue Mound, Elwin, Forsyth, Harristown, Long Creek, Macon, Maroa, Mount Zion, Niantic, Oakley, Oreana, and Warrensburg.

Climate

Demographics

2020 census

Note: the US Census treats Hispanic/Latino as an ethnic category. This table excludes Latinos from the racial categories and assigns them to a separate category. Hispanics/Latinos can be of any race.

The 2020 census reported there were 70,522 people and 31,073 households living in the city. Out of the 31,073 households, 21.0% had children under the age of 18 living with them, 35.9% were married couples living together, 36.1% had a female householder with no partner, and 20.6% had a male householder with no partner. The average family size was 3.00 persons.

The median household income for the city was $45,404, the median family income was $62,699, and the median married-couple family income was $77,901. The employment rate was 52.1%. 19.4% of Decatur residents were living below the poverty line; 30.2% of them were under 18 years old, 18.8% were ages 18 to 64, and 9.6% were 65 or older.

2010 census
As of the 2010 census, there were 76,122 people, 32,344 households, and 18,991 families residing in the city. The racial makeup of the city was 71.6% White, 23.3% African American, 0.2% Native American, 0.9% Asian, 0.9% from other races, and 3.1% from two or more races. Hispanic or Latino people of any race were 2.2% of the population.

There were 32,344 households, out of which 24.2% had children under the age of 18 living with them, 37.4% were married couples living together, 16.9% had a female household with no husband present, and 41.3% were non-families. 35.2% of all households were made up of individuals, and 13.2% had someone living alone who was 65 years of age or older. The average household size was 2.23 and the average family size was 2.86.

In the city, the population was spread out, with 22.1% under the age of 18, 10.8% from ages 18 to 24, 23.4% from ages 25 to 44, 26.8% from ages 45 to 64, and 16.9% who were 65 years of age or older. The median age was 39.1 years. For every 100 females, there were 88.0 males. For every 100 females aged 18 and over, there were 85.3 males.

As of 2017, the median income for a household in the city was $41,977, and the median income for a family was $55,086. Males had a median income of $35,418 versus $34,389 for females. The per capita income for the city was $25,042. About 22% of the population is below the poverty line, including 35% of those under age 18 and 10% of those age 65 or over.

Decatur is listed by the United States Census Bureau as number three in "The 15 Fastest-Declining Large Cities" which showed a 7.1% population loss of (−5,376) from 2010 to 2019. The Chicago Tribune says: "in 1980, Decatur's population was at a high of 94,000. Now it is 71,000."

Civics
A new branding effort for Decatur and Macon County was unveiled in 2015, Limitless Decatur. The intention of the marketing strategy was to attract and retain business and residents by promoting the Decatur area as modern and progressive with opportunities to live, work, and develop.

For much of the 20th century, the city was known as "The Soybean Capital of the World" owing to its being the location of the headquarters of A. E. Staley Manufacturing Company, a major grain processor in the 1920s, which popularized the use of soybeans to produce products for human consumption such as oil, meal and flour. At one time, over a third of all the soybeans grown in the world were processed in Decatur, Illinois.  In 1955 a group of Decatur businessmen founded the Soy Capital Bank to trade on the nickname.

Decatur was awarded the All-America City Award in 1960, one of eleven cities honored that year.

The city's symbol is the Transfer House, an 1896 octagonal structure that was built in the original town square (now called "Lincoln Square") where the city's mass transit lines (streetcars and interurban trains) met. Designed by Chicago architect William W. Boyington, who also designed the Chicago Water Tower, the Transfer House was constructed to serve as a shelter for passengers transferring from one conveyance to another.  It was regarded as one of the most beautiful structures of its kind in the United States, and a symbol of the city's high culture and modernity just decades after it was founded as a small collection of log cabins. The second story of the building consisted of an open-air gazebo used as a stage for public speeches and concerts by the Goodman Band.   Sitting in the middle of the square as it was, increasing automobile traffic flowing through downtown Decatur on US 51 was forced to circle around the structure, and the Transfer House came to be seen by some as an impediment. The Illinois Department of Transportation, who maintained the US 51 highway route through Decatur, requested it be removed, and in 1962, the structure was transported by truck to nearby Central Park, where it stands today. In that location, it has served as a bus shelter, a visitor information center, and civic group offices.

Neighborhoods
On July 19, 1999, the Department of Community Development prepared a map of the official neighborhoods of Decatur, used for planning and statistical purposes. Decatur has 71 official neighborhoods.

Sister cities
Decatur's sister cities are:
 Tokorozawa, Japan (since 1966)
 Seevetal, Germany (since 1975)

The Decatur Sister Cities Committee annually coordinates both inbound and outbound high school students, who serve as ambassadors among the three cities.

Government
Between 1829 and 1836, the County Commissioners Court had jurisdiction as it was the seat of Macon County. By 1836 the population reached approximately 300, and Richard Oglesby was elected president of the first board of trustees. Other members of the board of trustees included Dr. William Crissey, H.M. Gorin and Andrew Love as clerk.

In 1839 a town charter was granted to Decatur that gave power to the trustees "to establish and regulate a fire department, to dig wells and erect pumps in the streets, regulate police of the town, [and] raise money for the purpose of commencing and prosecuting works of public improvement." Those who served as president of the town of Decatur were: Richard Oglesby (1836), Joseph Williams (1837), Henry Snyder (1838), Kirby Benedict (1839), Joseph King (1840), Thomas P. Rodgers (1841), David Crone (1846–47), J.H. Elliott (1848), Joseph Kauffman (1849), Joseph King (1850), William S. Crissey (1851), W.J. Stamper (1852), William Prather (1853–54), and Thomas H. Wingate (1854–55).

In the winter of 1855–56, a special city incorporation charter was obtained. This charter provided an aldermanic form of government and on January 7, 1856, an election was held for mayor, two aldermen for each of the four wards, and city marshal. This aldermanic form of government continued until January 18, 1911, when Decatur changed to city commissioner form of government. The new commissioner system provided a mayor elected at-large and four commissioners to serve as administrators of city services: accounts and finance, public health and safety, public property, and streets and public improvements. The mayor also served as Commissioner of Public Affairs.

The mayor and commissioner system prevailed until a special election on November 25, 1958, in which the present council-manager form of government was adopted.
According to the city website, the "City of Decatur operates under the Council-Manager form of government, a system which combines the leadership of a representative, elected council with the professional background of an appointed manager." The mayor and all members of the council are elected at-large. Their duties include determining city policy and representing the city in public ceremonies, for which they receive nominal annual salaries. The appointed manager handles all city administration and is the council's employee, not an elected official. Since 1959, the following have served as City Managers: John E. Dever, W. Robert Semple, Leslie T. Allen, Jim Bacon, Jim Williams, Steve Garman, John A. Smith (acting), Ryan McCrady, Gregg Zientara (interim), Timothy Gleason, and Scot Wrighton, the current holder.

Julie Moore Wolfe serves as the current mayor of Decatur.  Moore Wolfe was appointed unanimously by the Decatur City Council following the death of Mayor Mike McElroy. She is the first female to be mayor of Decatur. Moore Wolfe, who had been appointed mayor pro tem in May 2015, became acting mayor after McElroy died on July 17, 2015. McElroy had been mayor since 2009 and had recently been re-elected to a second term as mayor in April 2015. Moore Wolfe was elected to a four-year term as mayor on April 4, 2017.

Mayors
Those who served as president of the town of Decatur were: Richard Oglesby (1836), Joseph Williams (1837), Henry Snyder (1838), Kirby Benedict (1839), Joseph King (1840), Thomas P. Rodgers (1841), David Crone (1846–47), J.H. Elliott (1848), Joseph Kauffman (1849), Joseph King (1850), William S. Crissey (1851), W.J. Stamper (1852), William Prather (1853–54), and Thomas H. Wingate (1854–55).

During the winter of 1855–56, a special incorporation charter of Decatur as a city was obtained providing for an aldermanic form of government.

 John P. Post (1856)
 William A. Barnes (1857)
 James Shoaff (1858)
 Alexander T. Hill (1859)
 Sheridan Wait (1860)
 Edward O. Smith (1861)
 Thomas O. Smith (1862)
 Jasper J. Peddecord (1863–1864)
 Franklin Priest (1865–66; 1870, 1874, 1878)
 John K. Warren (1867)
 Isaac C. Pugh (1868)
 William L. Hammer (1869)
 E.M. Misner (1871)
 D.S. Shellabarger (1872)
 Martin Forstmeyer (1873)
 R.H. Merriweather (1875)
 William B. Chambers (1876–1877; 1883–1884; 1891–1892)
 Lysander L. Haworth (1879)
 Henry W. Waggoner (1880–1882)
 Michael F. Kanan (1885–1890)
 David C. Moffitt (1893–1894)
 D.H. Conklin (1895–1896)
 B.Z. Taylor (1897–1898)
 George A. Stadler (1899–1900)
 Charles F. Shilling (1901–1904)
 George L. Lehman (1905–1906),
 E.S. McDonald (1907–1908)
 Charles M. Borchers (1909–1911; 1919–1923)
 Dan Dinneen (1911–1919)
 Elmer R. Elder (1923–1927)
 Orpheus W. Smith (1927–1935)
 Harry E. Barber (1935)
 Charles E. Lee (1936–1943)
 James A. Hedrick (1943–51)
 Dr. Robert E. Willis (1951–1955)
 Clarence A. Sablotny (1955–59)
 Jack W. Loftus, acting (1959)
 Robert A. Grohne (1959–1963)
 Ellis B. Arnold (May 1, 1963, to April 30, 1967)
 James H. Rupp (1966–1977)
 Elmer W. Walton (1977–1983)
 Gary K. Anderson (1983–1992)
 Erik Brechnitz (1992–1995)
 Terry M. Howley (1995–2003)
 Paul Osborne (2003–2008) (resigned)
 Mike Carrigan (2008–2009) (appointed)
 Mike McElroy (2009–2015)
 Julie Moore Wolfe (2015–present) (appointed 2015, elected 2017)

Police 

The Decatur police department has used public funds to support a controversial technique for 911 call analysis despite a consensus among experts that its application is scientifically baseless. After taking a two-day training course called “911 homicide: Is the caller the killer?” police officers present themselves as experts, relying on circumstantial clues rather than physical evidence. The Illinois Law Enforcement Training and Standards Board, designed to guard against junk science, has no record of scrutinizing the curriculum, but Decatur police have used it as evidence to imprison people for decades.

Culture

Decatur Municipal Band
The Municipal Band was organized September 19, 1857, making it one of the oldest nonmilitary bands in continuous service in the United States and Canada. The band was originally known as the Decatur Brass Band, Decatur Comet Band and Decatur Silver Band until 1871 when it was reorganized by Andrew Goodman and became The Goodman Band. In 1942, the band was officially designated as the Decatur Municipal Band and chartered within the City of Decatur. The present Decatur Municipal Band, directed by Jim Culbertson since 1979, is composed of high school and college students and area adults from all walks of life, many of whom look to the Band as a serious avocation, or as a prelude to a life-long profession.

Library
The Decatur Public Library was built with a grant from Andrew Carnegie. The library was built in 1902 at the corner of Eldorado and Main and opened to the public July 1, 1903. The building served the community until 1970 when the library moved to North Street at the site of a former Sears, Roebuck & Co. store. In 1999 the library moved to its present location on Franklin Street, which is also an abandoned Sears building. The library is part of the Illinois Heartland Library System.  The original Carnegie library building was razed and in its place a bank was built.

Sports

Professional football
Decatur was the original home of the Chicago Bears, from 1919 to 1920. The football team was then known as the Decatur Staleys and played at Staley Field, both named after the local food-products manufacturer. A.E. Staley created the team from regular Staley Processing employees who had an interest in the sport. As the team continued to win games and show promise, Staley decided to invest in the team further by hiring George Halas as its second head coach. Halas led the team to success in the 1920 season, going 10-1-2. As the team continued to win, Staley realized that he could make more money and further develop the team if there were larger crowds and a larger venue to play at. Halas and Staley agreed to move the team to Chicago in 1921 and play at Wrigley Field. The team was to play one season as the Chicago Staleys. In 1922, they played their first season as the Chicago Bears.

Professional baseball
From 1900 to 1974, Decatur was the home of the Commodores, a minor-league baseball team playing at Fans Field.

Tennis
The USTA/Ursula Beck Pro Tennis Classic has been held annually since 1999. Male players from over 20 countries compete for $25,000 in prize money as well as ATP world ranking points at the Fairview Park Tennis Complex. The tournament is held for eight consecutive days at Fairview Park concluding on the first weekend in August.

Professional golf
Decatur formerly hosted the annual Decatur-Forsyth Classic presented by Tate & Lyle and the Decatur Park District. The tournament was traditionally held in June. The final year for the tournament was 2019.

Softball
The following Decatur men's fast pitch softball teams have won national championships:

ADM
 1981 Amateur Softball Association (ASA) Champions
 1984 International Softball Congress (ISC) Champions

Decatur Pride
 1994 Amateur Softball Association (ASA) Champions
 1999 Amateur Softball Association (ASA) Champions
 1999 Amateur Softball Association (ASA) Champions
 2000 International Softball Congress (ISC) Champions

Decatur Legends
1999 Amateur Softball Association (ASA) 50 and over Champions
2000 Amateur Softball Association (ASA) 50 and over Champions

Media

Newspapers
 Decatur Tribune —weekly
 The Decaturian —bi-weekly student newspaper published by Millikin University
 Herald & Review —daily owned by Lee Enterprises

Magazines
 Decatur Magazine —bi-monthly

Television
 17 WAND, NBC
 23 WBUI, CW

AM radio

WDZ —1050AM—ESPN Radio
WSOY—1340AM —talk radio
1650 AM —Community

FM radio

WBGL —88.1 FM —Christian radio
WDCR (FM) —88.9 FM & 96.5 FM —Relevant Radio
WJMU —89.5 FM —Millikin University —alternative rock
WYDS —93.1 FM —top 40
WDZQ —95.1 FM —country music
WXFM —99.3 —Light Hits
WZUS —100.9 FM —talk radio
WLUJ — 101.9 FM – Moody Christian Radio
WSOY —102.9 FM —Top 40
WEJT —105.1 FM —adult hits
WCZQ —105.5 FM —hip hop & R&B
WZNX —106.7 FM —classic rock
WDKR —107.3 —oldies

Economy

Industry
Decatur has production facilities for Caterpillar, Archer Daniels Midland, Mueller Co., and Primient (previously Tate & Lyle, A. E. Staley).

Caterpillar Inc. has one of its largest manufacturing plants in the U.S. in Decatur. This plant produces Caterpillar's off highway trucks, wheel-tractor scrapers, compactors, large wheel loaders, mining-class motorgraders, and their ultra-class mining trucks (including the Caterpillar 797). Archer Daniels Midland processes corn and soybeans, Mueller produces water distribution products and Tate & Lyle processes corn in Decatur. 

Decatur has been ranked third in the nation as an Emerging Logistics and Distribution Center by Business Facilities: The Location Advisor, and was named a Top 25 Trade City by Global Trade. In 2013 the Economic Development Corporation of Decatur & Macon County established the Midwest Inland Port, a multi-modal transportation hub with market proximity to 95 million customers in a 500-mile radius. The port includes the Archer Daniels Midland intermodal container ramp, the two class I railroads that service the ramp and the city (the Canadian National Railway, and the Norfolk Southern Railway), five major roadways and the Decatur Airport. The Midwest Inland Port also has a foreign trade zone and customs clearing, and the area is both an enterprise zone and tax increment financing district.

In August 2019, Mueller Company announced plans to construct a "state-of-the-art" brass foundry in Decatur on a 30 acre site in the 2700 block of North Jasper Street. The facility is expected to employ 250 personnel.

In November 2020, ADM and InnovaFeed announced plans to construct the world's largest insect protein facility targeted to begin in 2021. The facility will be owned and operated by InnovaFeed and will co-locate with ADM's Decatur corn processing complex. This new project represents innovative, sustainable production to meet growing demand for insect protein in animal feed, a market that has potential to reach 1 million tons in 2027. Construction of the new high-capacity facility is expected to create more than 280 direct and 400 indirect jobs in the Decatur region by the second phase.

Top employers
According to the EDC of Decatur & Macon County, the top employers in Decatur are as follows:

Former employers

From 1917 to 1922 Decatur was the location of the Comet Automobile Co., and the Pan-American Motor Corp.

The Japanese corporation Bridgestone owns Firestone Tire and Rubber Corporation, which operated a large tire factory here. Firestone's Decatur plant was closed in December 2001 in the midst of a tire failure controversy, and all 1,500 employees were laid off. Firestone cited a decline in consumer demand for Firestone tires and the age of the Decatur plant as the reasons for closing that facility.

Education

Colleges
Millikin University (enrollment 2,400), a four-year institution of higher education, has a  campus founded by James Millikin and was originally affiliated with the Presbyterian Church (U.S.A.).
Richland Community College (enrollment 3,500) is a comprehensive community college. It also hosts the biannual Farm Progress Show.
Walther Theological Seminary is a Confessional Lutheran seminary affiliated with Pilgrim Lutheran Church.

Public schools
K–12 public education in the Decatur area is provided by the Decatur Public Schools District 61. High school athletics have been a member of the Central State Eight Conference since 2014–15.

High schools
Eisenhower High School
MacArthur High School
 William Harris Learning Academy

Primary schools
 American Dreamer STEM Academy
 Baum Elementary School
 Dennis Lab School
 Franklin Grove Elementary School
 Hope Academy
 Johns Hill Magnet School
 Montessori Academy for Peace
 Muffley Elementary School
 Parsons Elementary School
 Pershing Early Learning Center
 South Shores Elementary School
 Stephen Decatur Middle School
 William Harris Learning Academy

Private schools

High schools
 Lutheran School Association of Decatur
 St. Teresa High School

Primary Schools
 Antioch Christian Academy
 Holy Family Catholic School
 Lutheran School Association of Decatur
 Our Lady of Lourdes School
 St. Patrick School

Infrastructure

Parks
Local Macon County park resources include Lake Decatur, Lincoln Trail Homestead State Memorial, Rock Springs Conservation Area, Fort Daniel Conservation Area, Sand Creek Recreation Area, Griswold Conservation Area, Friends Creek Regional Park, and Spitler Woods State Natural Area. The Decatur Park District resources include  of park land, an indoor sports center, Decatur Airport, three golf courses, softball, soccer and tennis complexes, athletic fields, a community aquatic center, an AZA-accredited zoo, and a banquet, food and beverage business. Decatur was once dubbed "Park City USA" because it had more parks per person than any other city in the country, as well as "Playtown USA" because of Decatur's position as an early national leader in providing recreational space for its citizens. A motion picture short by that name was made in 1944 that featured the city's recreational efforts.

Transportation

Air
Decatur Airport is served by daily commercial flights on CRJ2 aircraft to and from Chicago-O'Hare International Airport by United Airlines.

Rail
For more than 100 years, Decatur has been a major railroad junction and was once served by seven railroads. After mergers and consolidations, it is now served by two Class I railroads: the Norfolk Southern Railway, and the Canadian National Railway. The city is also served by Decatur Junction Railway, Decatur Central Railroad and Decatur and Eastern Illinois Railroad shortlines.

Road
Interstate 72, U.S. Route 51, U.S. Route 36, Illinois Route 48, Illinois Route 105, and Illinois Route 121 are key highway links for the area.

Public transportation
The Decatur Public Transit System (DPTS) provides fixed-route bus service as well as complementary door-to-door paratransit service for people with disabilities, who are unable to use the bus system, throughout the City of Decatur. Under an agreement with the Village of Forsyth, service is also provided to the Hickory Point Mall area in Forsyth.

State government facilities
Decatur Correctional Center, a prison for women, is in the city.

In popular culture
Decatur has been mentioned in several movies, including the 1984 movie Bachelor Party, the 1986 movie Ferris Bueller's Day Off, and the 2008 movie Leatherheads.

Notable people

References

External links

 
 

 
Cities in Illinois
County seats in Illinois
Populated places established in 1836
Cities in Macon County, Illinois
Metropolitan areas of Illinois
1836 establishments in Illinois